Liran Chaya Kohener-Geyor (born ) is an Israeli beauty queen who won the Miss Israel pageant in 2007, and represented Israel in Miss World 2007.

Biography
Kohener was born in Rishon LeZion, Israel, to Israeli-born parents of Sephardic Jewish ancestry. Her father is of Turkish-Jewish descent, whereas her mother is of Moroccan-Jewish and Egyptian-Jewish descent. To celebrate her Bat Mitzvah, Kohener travelled with family all across Europe.

After graduating high school, she served as a soldier in the Israeli Air Force.

In 2009, she competed with fellow Miss Israel Elena Ralph in the first season of reality show HaMerotz LaMillion (the Israeli version of The Amazing Race).

She married Israeli naturopath and television persona Guy Geyor in 2015. They have two daughters.

See also
Israeli women

References

Israeli female models
Israeli Sephardi Jews
Miss World 2007 delegates
Miss Israel winners
1988 births
People from Rishon LeZion
Living people
Israeli people of Turkish-Jewish descent
Israeli people of Moroccan-Jewish descent
Israeli people of Egyptian-Jewish descent
Israeli Mizrahi Jews
The Amazing Race contestants